Vladimir Vala (born 12 April 1963) is a former Slovak male canoeist who won medals at senior level the Wildwater Canoeing World Championships.

World Championships results

World Cup results
Vala won seven editions of the Wildwater Canoeing World Cup in C2 classic.

References

External links
 

1963 births
Living people
Slovak male canoeists
Place of birth missing (living people)